The 2010 Open 13 is a men's tennis tournament played on indoor hard courts. It was the 17th edition of the Open 13, and is part of the International Series of the 2010 ATP World Tour. It took place at the Palais des Sports in Marseille, France, from February 15 through February 21, 2010.

It was also one of the few ATP tournaments to have been won only by European players, with France with 5 (Guy Forget, Fabrice Santoro, Arnaud Clément, Gilles Simon, and this year's defending champion Jo-Wilfried Tsonga), Sweden with 4 (Thomas Enqvist, Joachim Johansson), Switzerland with 4 (Marc Rosset, Roger Federer), Germany with 1 (Boris Becker), Russia with 1 (Yevgeny Kafelnikov), Slovakia with 1 (Dominik Hrbatý), and Great Britain with 1 (Andy Murray).

The singles draw feature ATP No. 8, 2009 French Open finalist Robin Söderling and defending champion Jo-Wilfried Tsonga. Other players include Gaël Monfils, Gilles Simon, Tommy Robredo, Mikhail Youzhny, Marcos Baghdatis and Julien Benneteau. The previous top two seeds here were Andy Murray and Juan Martín del Potro, but both had pulled out of the tournament earlier.

ATP entrants

Seeds

Rankings as of February 8, 2010.

Other entrants
The following players received wildcards into the main draw:
 David Guez
 Guillaume Rufin

The following players received entry from the qualifying draw:
 Ruben Bemelmans
 Stéphane Bohli
 Yannick Mertens
 Édouard Roger-Vasselin

The following players received entry as a lucky loser from the qualifying draw:
 Illya Marchenko
 Josselin Ouanna
 Laurent Recouderc

Finals

Singles

 Michaël Llodra defeated  Julien Benneteau, 6–3, 6–4
It was Llodra's first title of the year, 4th title of his career, and his second consecutive final of the event.

Doubles

 Julien Benneteau /  Michaël Llodra defeated  Julian Knowle /  Robert Lindstedt, 6–3, 6–4

References

External links
 Official website
 ITF tournament edition details
 

Open 13
Open 13